Hoya wayetii is a species of flowering plant in the genus Hoya native to the Philippines. Sometimes confused with Hoya kentiana or Hoya shepherdii, it has long, slender foliage that often has a red margin when exposed to sufficient sun. Like many others in its genus, it has a vining growth habit.

References

wayetii
Endemic flora of the Philippines
wayetii
Plants described in 1993